Hans Almström (born 1 August 1950) is a Swedish athlete. He competed in the men's shot put at the 1976 Summer Olympics.

References

External links

1950 births
Living people
Athletes (track and field) at the 1976 Summer Olympics
Swedish male shot putters
Olympic athletes of Sweden